Mary Lou Kolbenschlag (born March 15, 1992) is an American actress. She is best known for playing Mary Ferry on the Nickelodeon television series Unfabulous, also starring Emma Roberts.

Personal life
Mary Lou was born in Burbank, California, and attended Burbank High School, also attended by Blake Lively of Gossip Girl fame.

Mary Lou is a featured artist at charity events with her live country-western show. Since taking a four-year hiatus from acting in 2010, she attends Princeton University in Princeton, New Jersey, where she is studying Art History as a member of the Class of 2014. Here she is a member of The Triangle Club, the oldest touring collegiate original musical comedy organization in the nation. She also sings soprano with the "Princeton Roaring 20".

Mary Lou received awards at CARE from 2005 - 2006. This is a red carpet event intended to honor child actors for their positive contributions to society and to the entertainment industry.

She is the cousin of actress Danneel Ackles.

Career
Mary Lou's show business career started at age six when she entertained as a member of Singing Solo (a children's singing group located in La Mesa, CA) at a local street fair with a rendition of The Good Ship Lollipop.  After this performance, she chose acting as her career. Over the next few years, Lou went on to sing at over two dozen venues throughout Southern California, Texas and Tennessee, winning multiple local, state, regional, national and world championship titles.

Mary Lou has guest starred on Phil of the Future, as a math-nerd named Alex, as well as Glee, 3 lbs and What Should You Do?. She also appeared in made for TV movies including Future Girls: Adventures in Marine Biology and Bad Mother's Handbook. She continues to audition daily for feature films, television and voiceover.

In 2004, Mary Lou landed her most prominent role on Unfabulous as a nerd named  Mary Ferry. Sue Rose, executive producer of the show claims that Mary Ferry was only originally intended for one episode but was 'so funny and likable' she appears in thirty altogether. In 2008, the cast of Unfabulous were nominated for a Young Artist Award for Best Young Ensemble Performance in a TV Series.

Filmography

External links

Unfabulous Official Site

1992 births
21st-century American actresses
American child actresses
American film actresses
American television actresses
Living people
Actresses from California
People from Burbank, California